Barrussus is a genus of karschiid camel spiders, first described by Carl Friedrich Roewer in 1928.

Species 
, the World Solifugae Catalog accepts the following three species:

 Barrussus furcichelis Roewer, 1928 — Greece
 Barrussus pentheri (Werner, 1905) — Turkey
 Barrussus telescopus Karataş & Uçak, 2013 — Turkey

References 

Arachnid genera
Solifugae